Pseudopontia mabira is a butterfly in the  family Pieridae. It is found in Uganda and the Democratic Republic of Congo within about 5 degrees latitude north and south of the Equator.

References

Butterflies described in 2011
Pieridae
Lepidoptera of Uganda
Lepidoptera of the Democratic Republic of the Congo